Aerocardal is an airline based in Santiago, Chile. It operates international and domestic passenger charter services as well as medical services. Its main base is Comodoro Arturo Merino Benítez International Airport, Santiago.

History
Aerocardal was established in 1989. It operates a fleet of 11 aircraft including jets and turboprops as well as twin-turbine helicopters. The airline offers flights connecting major capitals as well as medium-sized or remote cities in the Americas and Europe.

Destinations
Aerocardal serves the following scheduled destinations within Chile:

 Santiago - Comodoro Arturo Merino Benitez International Airport - hub
 Robinson Crusoe Island - Robinson Crusoe Airport - stational

Additionally, the airline operates charter flights and air ambulances.

Fleet

Its fleet includes the following aircraft (as of July 2020):

2 Gulfstream G150
1 Gulfstream G280
1 Pilatus PC12
1 Dornier 228-100 (at August 2019)
2 Dornier 228-200 (at August 2019)
1 Eurocopter BO-105LS
3 Agusta Grand

Former fleet

2 Cessna Citation S550
2 Dornier 328-100
1 Piper Navajo Panther
1 Piper Cheyenne I
1 Cessna C421 Golden Eagle
1 Cirrus SR22 GTS X Edition
1 Eurocopter BO-105CB
1 Eurocopter EC135 T2

External links

References

Airlines of Chile
Airlines established in 1989
Chilean companies established in 1989